Get That Paper is the seventh studio album by American hip hop group Do Or Die. It was released on March 28, 2006 via Rap-A-Lot 4 Life. Production was handled by The Legendary Traxster, Cayex and Wax Master Maurice, with J. Prince serving as executive producer. It features guest appearances from Bun B and Johnny P. The album peaked at number 159 on the Billboard 200 and number 29 on the Top R&B/Hip-Hop Albums.

Track listing

Charts

References

External links

2006 albums
Do or Die (group) albums
Rap-A-Lot Records albums
Albums produced by The Legendary Traxster